Srinagarind Hospital is a university teaching hospital, affiliated to the Faculty of Medicine of Khon Kaen University, located in Mueang Khon Kaen District, Khon Kaen Province. It is a hospital capable of super tertiary care.

History 
On 23 June 1975, Khon Kaen University opened a small temporary building as a hospital for teaching and treatment of patients, named 'Hut Hospital'. The hospital then received aid in its development in an agreement between the government of Thailand and the government of New Zealand. King Bhumibol Adulyadej laid the foundation stone for the new hospital on 19 February 1976 and named it 'Srinagarind Hospital' in honour of Princess Srinagarindra. The hospital opened on 15 December 1983. Srinagarind Hospital was expanded and built the 'Marking Princess Srinagarindra 89th Birthday' Building (Akhan 89 Phansa Somdet Ya), increasing the number of operating theatres by 9. This was opened on 24 January 1995, by King Vajiralongkorn (then Crown Prince).

As a university hospital, it is generally regarded as one of the final referral centers for complicated and rare diseases from all hospitals, especially within Northeastern Thailand.

See also 
 Healthcare in Thailand
 Hospitals in Thailand
 List of hospitals in Thailand

References 

 Article incorporates material from the corresponding article in the Thai Wikipedia.

Teaching hospitals in Thailand
Hospitals in Thailand
Khon Kaen University